The 2001 Grand Prix SAR La Princesse Lalla Meryem was a women's tennis tournament played on outdoor clay courts in Casablanca, Morocco that was part of the Tier V category of the 2001 WTA Tour. It was the inaugural edition of the tournament and was held from 23 July until 29 July 2001. Unseeded Zsófia Gubacsi won the singles title and earned $16,000 first-prize money.

Finals

Singles

 Zsófia Gubacsi defeated  Maria Elena Camerin 1–6, 6–3, 7–6(7–5)
 It was Gubacsi's only singles title of her career.

Doubles

 Lubomira Bacheva /  Åsa Carlsson defeated  María José Martínez Sánchez /  María Emilia Salerni 6–3, 6–7(4–7), 6–1

External links
 ITF tournament edition details
 Tournament draws

Grand Prix Sar La Princesse Lalla Meryem
Morocco Open
Morocco
Grand Prix Sar La Princesse Lalla Meryem